Henry Cowell wrote his Piano Concerto (formally Concerto for Piano and Orchestra) in 1928. 

The piece contains many innovative uses of dissonance, cluster chords and extended uses of form.

History
Cowell completed his Piano Concerto in 1928, and premiered the first movement as soloist with the Conductorless Orchestra of New York City in April 1930; he was also the soloist in the first complete performance on December 28, 1930, with the Havana Philharmonic conducted by Pedro Sanjuan. It was only until 1978, long after the composer's death, that its first full performance was done in the United States.

Movements
The concerto is in three movements.

I. Polyharmony
The first movement, Polyharmony, begins with an orchestral tutti.

II. Tone Cluster

III. Counter Rhythm

Instrumentation
Woodwinds
2 Flutes
2 Oboes
2 Clarinets
2 Bassoons
Brass
2 French Horns
2 Trumpets
3 Trombones (third doubling bass trombone)
Tuba
Percussion
Timpani
Unpitched percussion (snare drum, tam-tam, cymbal)
Piano
Strings
16 Violins
8 Violas
8 Cellos
4 Basses

See also
List of solo piano compositions by Henry Cowell

References

20th-century classical music
1928 compositions
Compositions by Henry Cowell
Compositions that use extended techniques
Modernist compositions
Piano concertos